Holy Dead Trinity is a compilation album by the Polish death metal band Hate. Tracks 1–5 were recorded and mixed at Selani Studio, Olsztyn in September 1998.  Tracks 6–14 were recorded in the same studio in November, 1997.

Track listing
 "Holy Dead Trinity" – 3:33
 "No Life After Death" – 3:17
 "Victims" – 3:16
 "God Overslept" – 3:11
 "The Kill (Napalm Death cover)" – 0:19
 "Share Your Blood With Daemon" – 3:03
 "World Has To Die" – 3:29
 "Dead & Mystified" – 3:36
 "Enter The Hell" – 0:46
 "Convocation" – 2:55
 "Lord Is Avenger" – 2:42
 "Paradise As Lost" – 3:38
 "Pagan Triumph" – 1:36
 "Satan's Horde" – 4:00

Total playing time 39:21

Personnel
 Adam "ATF Sinner" Buszko – guitars, vocals
 Ralph – guitars
 Cyprian – bass
 Mittloff – drums

Other credits
All music by ATF Sinner, Ralph and Daniel (former bassist)
Symphonical tracks by ATF Sinner
Lyrics by ATF Sinner

Engineered and mixed by Andrew Bomba
Mastered by Piotr Madziar

References

External links
 
 Encyclopaedia Metallum

2005 compilation albums